Asparagus curillus is a shrub distributed in the tropical and temperate climate (1000 – 2250 meter altitude) of the central Himalaya.  It is known as shatawar in traditional Ayurvedic medicine in which it is used as a demulcent, an herbal tonic, to terminate pregnancies, and to treat gonorrhea and diabetes. This plant contains oligospirostanosides, oligofurostanosides, sarsasapogenin glycoside, steroidal saponins, and steroidal glycosides.

References

curillus